The largemouth triplefin, Ucla xenogrammus, is a fish of the family Tripterygiidae and only member of the genus Ucla, found in the Pacific Ocean from Viet Nam, the Philippines, Palau and the Caroline Islands to Papua New Guinea, Australia (including Christmas Island), and the Solomon Islands, Fiji, Tonga, east to American Samoa and Rapa Iti, at depths of between . The generic name was coined by ichthyologist Richard Heinrich Rosenblatt in his unpublished dissertation of 1959 from the University of California Los Angeles and it is the initials of that institution, it was formally applied by Holleman in 1993.

References

External links
 

Tripterygiidae
Taxa named by Wouter Holleman
Fish described in 1993